University of Buea (UB) is found in Molyko, Buea, in the southwest region of Cameroon. It was founded as a university centre in 1985 and became a full-fledged university in 1992, following a government decree that re-organized state universities in the country. It is regarded as the best university in Cameroon and is one of two English speaking universities in Cameroon, alongside the University of Bamenda, which follow the British system of education. It serves citizens from both anglophone and francophone regions of Cameroon and from neighboring countries such as Nigeria and Equatorial Guinea.

Location
UB is in the historic town of Buea, former capital of German Kamerun, former capital of British Cameroon, former capital of the federated State of West Cameroon, and now the regional capital of the Southwest Region of Cameroon. Although the university draws its students mainly from the English-speaking part of Cameroon, it also serves the other regions of the country.

Admissions
Admission into the university is not competitive.

Student body and staff
The student population is over 13,000, including 50 who are physically and visually disabled. Adequate welfare provision for this latter category of students remains a challenge for the university administration.

There are 300 permanent and 200 part-time teaching staff. In addition to teaching, the staff undertake research in fields that are relevant to national development. UB has about 473 support staff.

Faculties and schools
UB has seven faculties:
 Faculty of Engineering and Technology (FET)
 Faculty of Arts
 Faculty of Education
 Faculty of Health Sciences
 Faculty of Science
 Faculty of Social and Management Sciences
 Faculty of Agriculture and Veterinary Medicine
 Faculty of Laws and Political Science

UB has three schools or colleges:
 Advanced School of Translators and Interpreters
 College of Technology (COT)
 Higher Technical Teachers Training College (in Kumba)

Infrastructure
Training at the university is supported by lecture halls, teaching and research laboratories. UB is connected to an optic fiber link to Camtel, a telecommunications company. In keeping with the New University Governance Policy of Cameroon, the outreach activities of the university are increasingly involving the private sector in funding and training so as to ensure that the graduates are relevant in the labour market. The University of Buea provides assistance and plays a leadership role to several other educational institutions all over Cameroon.

As in most English-speaking institutions, the governance system of the university is based on structures such as Council, Senate, Congregation and Committees on which staff and students are represented.

Technology
The main campus has a campus-wide optical-fiber network linking most of the buildings. Internet connectivity is provided via a VSAT link.

The IT Centre runs an Internet café for Internet access by staff and students at a modest cost.

The university is making use of recent technology developments. This is done by partnering with top tech companies in Buea, Cameroon.
University of Buea is one of the universities in Cameroon that has a 100 percent online registration process. Students apply and complete their admission online.

Students are equally able to register courses online and check results online. The use of mobile money to pay fees is another  innovation used by the University of Buea.

Library

The Buea University library operates in two buildings: 
 The Main library houses the open stacks book collection, quick reference and general reference books. The library is between the science laboratories, the Faculty of Arts Building and the Annex Library.
 The Annex library is behind the Faculty of Arts Building. It contains special collections — reserve books/lecturer notes, archives, journals and the Cameroon collection. The library also houses cassettes, video tapes, microfilm and CD-ROM resources.

Faculty, staff, and students use the library collection. Alumni, users from institutions affiliated with UB and members of the public can, with authorization, use the library.

Outreach and cooperation
The University of Buea has linkages with foreign universities and cooperation with international organisations. The linkages usually aim at the exchange of staff and students whilst international organisations usually assist the university with capacity building of staff and funding for research. University of Buea is affiliated to the University of Manchester.

Gallery

References

External links
Resources for students in the University of Buea
University of Buea
University of Buea website

Buea
Educational institutions established in 1992
1992 establishments in Cameroon
Buea